Apachesaurus is an extinct genus of metoposaurid temnospondyl amphibian from western North America.

Description and taxonomy
 
Apachesaurus was described from the Late Triassic (late Norian-Rhaetian) Redonda Formation of eastern New Mexico as a small, diminutive genus of metoposaurid. The small elongate centra were used by Hunt (1993) to consider Apachesaurus a small species of metoposaurid. However, Gee et al. (2017, 2018) demonstrated that centra referred to Apachesaurus are juveniles rather than small adults, concluding that Apachesaurus specimens are juveniles, though they cautioned they could not determine whether these are Anaschisma or a distinct taxon in its own right.

References

Branson, E.B., and M.G. Mehl, 1929. Triassic amphibians from the Rocky Mountain region. University of Missouri Studies 4:155-239.
Gregory, J. T., 1980. The otic notch of metoposaurid labyrinthodonts, pp. 125–136 in: Jacobs L. L. (ed.) Aspects of Vertebrate History: Essays in Honor of Edwin H. Colbert. Museum of Northern Arizona.
Davidow-Henry, B., 1987. New Metoposaurs from the southwestern United States and their phylogenetic relationships. Unpublished MS thesis, Texas Tech University, Lubbock, 75 p.
Long, R.A., and P.A. Murry, 1995. Late Triassic (Carnian and Norian) tetrapods from the southwestern United States. New Mexico Museum of Natural History and Science Bulletin 4.

Triassic temnospondyls of North America
Triassic amphibians of North America